Gang Huian (1417?-1464), pen name Injae 인재, was a prominent scholar and painter of the early Joseon period. He was good at poetry, calligraphy, and painting. He entered royal service by passing gwageo in 1441 under the reign of king Sejong (1397–1418–1450).

Birth Uncertainty

Gang Huian and his younger brother Gang Huimaeng were the sons of Gang Seokteok (1395–1459) and cousins of king Munjong (1414–1450–1452), king Sejo (1417 –1455–1468) and Prince Anpyeong 이용 안평대군 (1418–1453), that were the first three sons of king Sejong.

Nevertheless, the year of birth of Gang Huian is unclear. Part of the references say 1417, 
part of them say 1419... None of these sources ever mention this discrepancy.
Britannica specifies the more precise 1417(태종 17)~1464(세조 10).

Gallery

The Korean Copyright Commission lists 5 paintings for Gang Huian, while Towooart gives a short notice.

References

Bibliography

See also
Korean painting
List of Korean painters
Korean art
Korean culture

External links
Arts of Korea, an exhibition catalog from The Metropolitan Museum of Art Libraries (fully available online as PDF), which contains material on Gang Huian

15th-century Korean painters
15th-century Korean calligraphers
15th-century Korean poets
1464 deaths
1419 births
People from Gyeonggi Province
Korean male poets